The list of shipwrecks in September 1871 includes ships sunk, foundered, grounded, or otherwise lost during September 1871.

1 September
In the Whaling Disaster of 1871, 32 American whaling ships – one of them registered in the Kingdom of Hawaii – were trapped in pack ice in the Chukchi Sea in a line about 60 miles (97 km) south of Point Franklin, Alaska Territory, and abandoned between 1 and 14 September. All 1,219 people aboard the ships were rescued by seven other whaling ships – Arctic, Chance, Daniel Webster, Europa, Lagoda, Midas, and Progress – that had not become trapped. One trapped vessel, Minerva was discovered intact in 1872 and returned to service, but the other ships were crushed in the ice, sank, wrecked on the coast, or were stripped of wood or burned by the local Inupiat people. Details of each wreck are below.

2 September

3 September

4 September

5 September

6 September

7 September

8 September

9 September

10 September

11 September

12 September

13 September

14 September

15 September

16 September

17 September

18 September

19 September

20 September

21 September

22 September

23 September

24 September

25 September

26 September

27 September

28 September

29 September

30 September

Unknown date

References

Bibliography
Ingram, C. W. N., and Wheatley, P. O., (1936) Shipwrecks: New Zealand disasters 1795–1936. Dunedin, NZ: Dunedin Book Publishing Association.

1871-09
Maritime incidents in September 1871